Black Dog: Being A Teacher is a 2019–2020 South Korean television series starring Seo Hyun-jin, Ra Mi-ran and Ha Jun. It aired on tvN's Mondays and Tuesdays time slot from December 16, 2019 to February 4, 2020. It is a well-made drama in which viewers sympathized greatly with the realistic situation, conflicts and villains facing fixed-term teachers in the drama. Internationally, it is available streaming on Netflix.

Synopsis
Go Ha-neul (Seo Hyun-jin) becomes a temporary teacher at a private school, but she faces many struggles in her new position. However, she's determined to do her best and help her students as they face the various trials that exist in the highly competitive private school setting. With the guidance of Park Sung-soon (Ra Mi-ran), the head of the school’s career counseling department, and Do Yeon-woo (Ha Jun), a Korean language teacher with an unwavering passion for teaching, Go Ha-neul finds the strength to overcome the challenges of teaching in today’s cutthroat education system, growing both as a person and a teacher.

Cast

Main
 Seo Hyun-jin as Go Ha-neul
After a teacher saved her when she was a student, Ha-neul decided to become one herself. Years later, she starts working as a temporary teacher at a private high school and, through struggles, grows as a teacher and as a person.
 Ra Mi-ran as Park Sung-soon
An experienced teacher who becomes Ha-neul's mentor. She is a Korean language teacher and Head of College Admission, and is known as a workaholic among the students.
 Ha Jun as Do Yeon-woo
A Korean language teacher who is very popular among students.

Supporting
 Lee Chang-hoon as Bae Myeong-soo
 Baek Eun-hye as Song Chan-hee	
 Lee Hang-na as Song Young-sook
 Jung Hae-kyun as Moon Soo-ho
 Kim Hong-pa as Byeon Seong-joo
 Yoo Min-kyu as Ji Hae-won
 Park Ji-hwan as Song Yeong-tae
 Lee Eun-saem as Jin Yoo-ra
 Jo Yeon-hee as Kim Yi-boon
 Lee Yoon-hee as Lee Seung-taek
 Heo Tae-hee as Ha Soo-hyeon
 Ye Soo-jung as Yoon Yeo-hwa

Special appearances
 Ryu Ji-eun as young Go Ha-neul
 Tae In-ho as Kim Young-ha, Ha Neul's former high school teacher (Ep.1-2)
 Woo Mi-hwa as Han Jae-hee (Math and creative experience teacher)

Ratings

References

External links
  
 
 

TVN (South Korean TV channel) television dramas
2019 South Korean television series debuts
2020 South Korean television series endings
Korean-language television shows
South Korean high school television series
Television series about educators
Television series by Studio Dragon
Television series by Urban Works Media